Mogorić is a village in the Lika-Senj County, Croatia. The settlement is administered as a part of the city of Gospić.

Location
It is located in Lika, 23 kilometers from Gospić.

History
Mogorić is named after the Mogorović family, who built a fortress in the village. In 1577, the fortress was recorded as being manned by Ottoman soldiers.

Population
According to national census of 2011, population of the settlement is 110. This represents 28.72% of its pre-war population according to the 1991 census.

The 1991 census recorded that 94.52% of the village population were ethnic Serbs (362/383), 1.04% were Croats (4/383), 0.26% were Yugoslavs (1/383) while 4.18% were of other ethnic origin (16/383).

References

Bibliography

External links
 Mogorić 

Populated places in Lika-Senj County
Serb communities in Croatia